The 2013 MLS Supplemental Draft was a secondary draft that was held by Major League Soccer via conference call on January 22, 2013.  The draft was four rounds with all 19 MLS clubs participating.

Selection order 
The official selection order was announced by Major League Soccer on December 6, 2012:

 The nine clubs which did not qualify for the playoffs received picks #1 through #9 (in reverse order of season points);
 The two clubs eliminated in the Knockout round of playoffs received picks #10 and #11 (in reverse order of season points);
 The four clubs eliminated in the Conference Semifinals received picks #12 through #15 (in reverse order of season points);
 The two clubs eliminated in the Conference Finals received picks #16 and #17 (in reverse order of season points);
 The club which lost 2012 MLS Cup received pick #18;
 The club which won 2012 MLS Cup received pick #19.

This selection order pertained to all rounds of the MLS Supplemental Draft.

Official webpage: http://www.mlssoccer.com/superdraft/2013/supplemental-draft

Round 1

Round 1 trades

Round 2

Round 2 trades

Round 3

Round 3 trades

Round 4

Other 2013 Supplemental Draft Trade Notes

 Toronto FC acquired the #38 pick in the 2013 MLS Supplemental Draft from Los Angeles Galaxy per the official selection order released by MLS on 17 January 2013. Trade details were not released.
 On 30 March 2011, Toronto FC acquired a then third-round selection in the 2013 Supplemental Draft from Colorado Rapids in exchange for midfielder Josh Janniere. The traded pick was reported as Colorado's natural selection. This pick should have become a fourth-round Supplemental Draft selection when the SuperDraft was shortened to two rounds but was not reflected in the official draft order released by MLS on 17 January 2013. It is assumed the trade was for a conditional pick and the conditions were not satisfied.

References 

Major League Soccer drafts
Mls Supplemental Draft, 2013
MLS Supplemental Draft